The 1994–95 A Group was the 47th season of the A Football Group, the top Bulgarian professional league for association football clubs, since its establishment in 1948.

Overview
It was contested by 16 teams, and Levski Sofia won the championship and its first three-peat. LEX Lovech, winners of the B Group in the previous season, played in A Group for the first time in their history.

League standings

Results

Champions
Levski Sofia

Sirakov left the club during a season.

Top scorers

Source:1994–95 Top Goalscorers

References

External links
Bulgaria - List of final tables (RSSSF)
1994–95 Statistics of A Group at a-pfg.com

First Professional Football League (Bulgaria) seasons
Bulgaria
1